Deoghar (pronounced Devaghar) is a major city in Jharkhand, India. It is a holy sacred place of Hinduism. It is one of the 12 Jyotirlingas sites of Hinduism (Baidyanath Temple). The sacred temples of the city make this a place for pilgrimage and tourists. The city is administrative headquarter of Deoghar District at Santhal Parganas division of Jharkhand.

Etymology
Deoghar is a Hindi word and the literal meaning of ‘Deoghar’ is abode (‘ghar’) of the Gods and Goddesses (‘dev’). Deoghar is also known as “Baidyanath Dham”, “Baba Dham”, “B. Deoghar”. The origin of Baidyanathdham is lost in antiquity. It has been referred to as Haritakivan or Ketakivan in Sanskrit Texts. The name Deoghar seems to be of recent origin and probably dates from the erection of the great temple of Lord Baidyanath. Although the name of the builder of the temple is not traceable, certain parts of the front portion of the temple are said to have been built by Puran Mal, an ancestor of the Maharaja of Giddhour, in 1596 but by sanatan dharma it is believed that it is built by Lord Vishwakarma. Deoghar is a place of worship for Lord Shiva, in the month of Shravan many devotees take ganga jal from Sultanganj to Deoghar for worship and they get the desired wish of their life.

Religious significance

Deoghar, also known as Baidyanath Dham, is an important Hindu pilgrimage site. It is one of the twelve and also one of the 51, and is famous for the mela of Shrawan, 4th month according to the Hindu calendar system. It is, along with Shrisailam, one of the few places in India where the Jyotirlinga and the Shaktipeeth are together, lying side beside each other. Each year between July and August (on the eve of the month of Shrawan) in Deoghar Yatra, about 7 to 8 million devotees come from various part of India bringing holy water from various areas of Ganges at Sultanganj, which is almost  from Deoghar, in order to offer it to Lord Shiva. During that month, a line of people in saffron-dyed clothes stretches over the full . It is the longest Mela of Asia.

The temple of Baidyanath or Lord Shiva is the most important of all the temples in the courtyard. The temple faces the east and is a plain stone structure with a pyramidal tower, 72 feet tall. The top contains three ascending shaped gold vessels that are compactly set, and were donated by the Maharaja of Giddhaur. Besides these pitcher shaped vessels, there is a Punchsula (five knives in a trident shape), which is rare. In the inner top, there is an eight-petaled lotus jewel called Chandrakanta Mani.

Geography

Location
It has an average elevation of 255 metres (833 feet). It is a part of the Indian peninsular plateau which forms a part of the oldest landmass on Earth, Gondwana land. Deoghar is situated on the bank of Ajay river (which originates from Batpar village of Jamui district in Bihar) and its tributary Dadhawa river (which originates from Purnia Lake near Karangarh village  in Jamui district of Bihar). The city is surrounded with various small relict hills such as Dighriya Pahaad, Nandan Pahaad, Trikuti Pahaad, and Tapovan Pahaad. Dighriya Pahaad forms the western boundary of the city and there is a national park being constructed on these hills. Nandan Pahaad is a children's amusement place and serves as one of the principal recreational places in the city. Tapovan Pahaad has its cultural relevance found in Hindu scriptures. It is one of the amusement places in the city and serves as a habitat for monkeys.

Area

Demographics

Population 

According to the 2011 Census of India, Deoghar had a total population of 203,123, of which 107,997 (53%) were males and 95,126 (47%) were females. Population in the age range 0–6 years was 2,6893 (13%). The total number of literate persons in Deoghar was 150,988 out of which 85,439 are males while 65,549 are females. Average literacy rate of Deoghar city is 85.68 percent of which male and female literacy was 91.24 and 79.37 percent.

Religion 
Hinduism is the prominent religion in Deoghar followed by 94.30% of the population. Islam is second most followed religion in city by 4.96% of the people. Minorities are Christians 0.53%, Jainism by 0.07%, Sikhism by 0.03% and Buddhism by 0.03%. Around 0.04% stated other religion and approximately 0.04% stated 'no particular religion.

Economy

The Economy of Deoghar is largely dependent on religious tourism and hospitality.  Deoghar is the fifth largest city in the state of Jharkhand, and one of the major industrial hubs.

Industry in Deoghar is mainly based on IT, agriculture, hospitality, petroleum, tourism, and in the service sector. Hotels like Amrapali Clarks Inn (a collab of Amrapali Groups & Clarks Inn Group of Hotels), Hotel Imperial Heights, etc. are renowned groups of hospitality industry here. Various small and middle scale industries are present in Deoghar - HIL Ltd, MR Real Food, Shree Guru Agrotech, PDRD Rice Mill, Tulsi Agro Foods. Some large industrial projects are also present:
 Jalsar Solar Park: Established by Jharkhand Renewable Energy Development Agency
 Plastic Park and Plastic Recycling unit
 Central Institute of Plastics Engineering & Technology
Indian Oil Corporation has one of its terminals in Deoghar. This is located at Badladih, Jasidih. This has a huge capacity for employment. After the opening and coming of this terminal, the unemployment rate has decreased because of many people getting jobs from this company.

Software Technology Parks of India (STPI) is a company / organization which promotes IT and technology industries. This company has set up many IT park branches in many cities such as Bangalore, Hyderabad, Patna and Ranchi. Same as the others, it has set up another IT Park branch in Deoghar. It is almost completed and opened.

Culture 
Deoghar city is usually referred to as the cultural capital of Jharkhand. The official languages of the city of Deoghar are Hindi and Khortha, while other native languages like Angika and Santhali are also spoken.

Tourism 
The holy city of Deoghar is home to various tourist attractions such as : 

Baidyanath Temple, one of the twelve Jyotirlinga in India
 Tapovan Caves and Hills: This series of caves and hills is located 10 km from Deoghar and has a temple of Shiva called Taponath Mahadeva. In one of the caves a Shiva lingam is installed, and it is said that Sage Valmiki came here for penance.
 Naulakha Mandir: It is a temple located 1.5 km from the 146 ft. high main temple. It is very similar to the temple of Ramakrishna Mission in Belur Math cand it is dedicated to Radha-Krishna. Since its construction cost  ₹9 lakh, it is also known as Naulakha temple.
 Basukinath Temple: Basukinath is a place of worship for Hindus and is located in the Dumka district of Jharkhand on the Deoghar-Dumka state highway. Pilgrims visit the temple each year from all of India to worship the presiding deity Shiva. The crowd at the temple drastically increases in the month of Shravan. It is widely believed that the Basukinath Temple is the court of Baba Bhole Nath. The temples of Shiva and Parvati are located in front of each other in the Basukinath Temple. The gates to both of these temples open in the evening, and it is believed that Shiva and Parvati meet each other at this time. Devotees are asked to move away from the front gates of the temple. Other small temples that are dedicated to different Gods and Goddesses can also be found inside the compound.
 Satsang Ashram - It's the holy place where Sri Sri Thakur Anukuchandra had spent his life. Many devotees come everyday here to have darsan of Thakur Parivar . This is the epicenter of the Satsang Revolution and also the chief centre of this movement. In the Ashram many devotees live permanently as natives.
Trikut Hill is a trendy picnic spot and a pilgrimage site located 21 km from the main city.
Ramakrishna Mission Vidyapith, Deoghar

Education 
 A.S.College
 All India Institute of Medical Sciences, Deoghar
 Birla Institute of Technology, Deoghar (Ranchi Offcampus)
 Jawahar Navodaya Vidyalaya, Deoghar
 Ramakrishna Mission Vidyapith, Deoghar
 DAV

Transportation

Airport

Deoghar is served by Deoghar Airport (IATA: DGH, ICAO: VEDO), which is approximately 12 km (7.4 mi) from the city centre. The airport was inaugurated by Prime Minister Narendra Modi on July 12, 2022. As of now IndiGo operates its flight services only for Kolkata and Delhi.  Flights for some other destinations that includes both Ranchi, Patna and Bengaluru are expected to start in upcoming months.

Trains 
Jasidih Junction is the nearest train station serving Deoghar. It is located on the Delhi-Patna-Kolkata train route.

Deoghar Junction is the railway station located in the city. It is on the Jasidih-Dumka-Rampurhat & Jasidih-Banka-Bhagalpur line. There are trains to Ranchi, Dumka, Rampurhat, Munger, Bhagalpur, Banka, Agartala etc.

Healthcare 

 All India Institute of Medical Sciences, Deoghar is a medical school started by government of India. A 40-room outpatient department was inaugurated in 2021, including a night shelter facility for the patients and attendants. Online registration facilities were launched on 3 September 2021. On July 12, 2022, the 250-bed in-patient department (IPD) and operation theatre is opened for public for treatment facilities. The rest 500- bed in-patient department is soon to completed for the patients, making it total 750 beds by the beginning of year 2023.
 District Hospital, Deoghar offer varies treatment and surgeries for patients.

See also
 List of cities in Jharkhand
 List of cities in Jharkhand by population
 Deoghar (community development block)

References

External links 

 

 
Cities and towns in Anga Desh
Cities and towns in Deoghar district
Hindu holy cities
Holy cities
Ancient Indian cities
Jharkhand
Places in Hindu worship